Phillip M. Hoose (born May 31, 1947) is an American writer of books, essays, stories, songs, and articles. His first published works were written for adults but he turned his attention to children and young adults, in part to keep up with his daughters. His work has been well received and honored more than once by the children's literature community. He won the Boston Globe–Horn Book Award, Nonfiction, for The Race to Save the Lord God Bird (2004) and the National Book Award, Young People's Literature, for Claudette Colvin (2009).

Life
Hoose was born in South Bend, Indiana, grew up in the Indiana towns of South Bend, Angola, and Speedway, and attended Indiana University.  A graduate of the Yale School of Forestry & Environmental Studies, Hoose was for 37 years a staff member of The Nature Conservancy, dedicated to preserving the plants, animals and natural communities of the Earth. Hoose has two children, Hannah and Ruby, who are grown. He lives in Portland, Maine, with his wife, the artist Sandbi Ste. George.

A songwriter and performing musician, Phillip Hoose is a founding member of the Children's Music Network and a member of the band Chipped Enamel.

Writer
Hey, Little Ant (Tricycle Press, 1998), inspired by his daughter Ruby and co-authored by his daughter Hannah, received a Jane Addams Children’s Book Award.

It’s Our World, Too!: Stories of Young People Who Are Making a Difference (Little, Brown, 1998) won a Christopher Award for "artistic excellence in books affirming the highest values of the human spirit."

We Were There, Too!: Young People in U.S. History (Farrar, Straus and Giroux, 2001) was a finalist for the National Book Award.  In addition, it was dubbed a Publishers Weekly Best Book of the Year and an International Reading Association Teacher's Choice.

The Race to Save the Lord God Bird (Farrar, Straus and Giroux, 2004), received the Boston Globe–Horn Book Award, and was named a Top Ten American Library Association Best Book for Young Adults among many additional honors.

Claudette Colvin: Twice Toward Justice (Farrar, Straus and Giroux, 2009) is a nonfiction account for young adults. It features Claudette Colvin as a pioneer in the Civil Rights Movement, resisting segregation in Montgomery, Alabama. It won the annual National Book Award for Young People's Literature and was a runner-up for the Newbery Medal, among other honors (below).

Moonbird: A Year on the Wind with the Great Survivor B95 (Farrar, Straus and Giroux, 2012) is a nonfiction account of a shorebird, a red knot, banded B95, that has flown more than the distance to the moon over his lifetime. It was a finalist in the Young Adult Library Services Association Award for Excellence in Nonfiction.

The Boys Who Challenged Hitler: Knud Pedersen and the Churchill Club (Farrar, Straus and Giroux, 2015) opens at the outset of World War II as Denmark chooses not to resist German occupation. Deeply ashamed of his nation’s leaders, fifteen-year-old Knud Pedersen resolved with his brother and a handful of schoolmates to take action against the Nazis if the adults would not. Naming their secret club after the fiery British leader, the young patriots in the Churchill Club committed countless acts of sabotage, infuriating the Germans, who eventually had the boys tracked down and arrested. But their efforts were not in vain: the boys’ exploits and eventual imprisonment helped spark a full-blown Danish resistance. Interweaving his own narrative with the recollections of Knud himself, Phillip Hoose weaves an inspiring non-fiction story of young war heroes.

Awards
Hoose reaped many honors for several of his books.
Claudette Colvin: Twice Towards Justice
National Book Award for Young People's Literature
Newbery Honor
Robert F. Sibert Award – Honor
YALSA Award for Excellence in Nonfiction – finalist
Jane Addams Children's Book Award – Honor Book
Booklist Top 10 Biographies for Youth
Publishers Weekly Best Children's Books of the Year
CCBC Choice (University of Wisconsin)
Chicago Public Library Best of the Best
Vermont Dorothy Canfield Fisher Award Master List
Carter G. Woodson Book Award – Middle Level

The Race to Save the Lord God Bird
Boston Globe – Horn Book Award, Nonfiction
Orbis Pictus Honor Book
Bank Street / Flora Steiglitz Award
Parents' Choice Award
ALA Best Books for Young Adults
ALA Notable Books for Children
National Science Teacher's Association-CBC, Outstanding Science Trade Books for Children
Miami Herald Best Books of the Year
Washington Post Best Books of the Year
Kirkus Reviews Editor's Choice
Publishers Weekly Best Children's Books of the Year
Great Lakes Book Award
Maine Lupine Award
New Jersey Garden State Teen Book Award
Tennessee Intermediate Volunteer State Book Award Master List

We Were There Too!: Young People in U.S. History
National Book Award – finalist
ALA Best Books for Young Adults
IRA Teachers' Choices
New York Public Library Books for the Teen Age
Parents' Choice Award
NCSS-CBC Notable Trade Book in the Field of Social Studies
Booklinks Lasting Connection
Booklist Editors' Choice
Horn Book Magazine Fanfare List
Publishers Weekly Best Children's Books of the Year

Moonbird: A Year on the Wind with the Great Survivor B95
Robert F. Sibert Award – Honor
YALSA Award for Excellence in Nonfiction – finalist

The Boys Who Challenged Hitler: Knud Pedersen and The Churchill Club
The Robert F. Sibert Informational Book Honor
The Boston Globe-Horn Book NonFiction Honor Winner
School Library Journal Best Book of the Year
Kirkus Reviews 10 Teen Books You Can’t Miss This Summer 2015
Kirkus Reviews Best Book of the Year and Best Teen Book of the Year
Booklist Editor’s Choice
New York Public Library Notable Book
New York Times Book Review Editor’s Choice
Washington Post Best Children’s Books of 2015
YALSA 2016 Nonfiction Award Nominations
Scholastic TAB Top 5 Buzz-worthy

Works

Hoosiers: the Fabulous Basketball Life of Indiana, Vintage Books, 1986, ; Emmis Books, 1995, 
Hey, Little Ant, Tricycle Press, 1998, 
We Were There, Too!: Young People in U.S. History, Farrar Straus Giroux, 2001, 
It's Our World, Too!: Young People Who Are Making a Difference, Farrar Straus Giroux, 2002, 
The Race to Save the Lord God Bird, Farrar, Straus and Giroux, 2004, 
 Perfect, Once Removed: When Baseball Was All the World to Me, Walker & Company, 2006, 
Claudette Colvin: Twice Toward Justice, Farrar, Straus and Giroux, 2009, 
 Moonbird: A Year on the Wind with the Great Survivor B95, Farrar, Straus and Giroux, 2012, 
 The Boys Who Challenged Hitler: Knud Pedersen and The Churchill Club, Farrar, Straus and Giroux. 2015, 
Attucks!: Oscar Robertson and the Basketball Team That Awakened a City, Farrar, Straus and Giroux. 2018,

Anthologies
"Indiana's Cinderella Basketball Team", Indiana history: a book of readings, Editor Ralph D. Gray, Indiana University Press, 1994,

See also

References

External links

 
 Mary Pipher's use of Hey, Little Ant
 

 

1947 births
Living people
American children's writers
National Book Award for Young People's Literature winners
Newbery Honor winners
Writers from Portland, Maine
Writers from South Bend, Indiana
Indiana University alumni
Yale School of Forestry & Environmental Studies alumni
20th-century American writers
21st-century American writers